The California High School Proficiency Exam (CHSPE) is an early exit testing program established under California law (specifically, California Education Code Section 48412). Testers who pass the CHSPE receive a Certificate of Proficiency from the California State Board of Education which is equivalent to a high school diploma. All individuals and institutions subject to California law that require a high school diploma must accept the CHSPE certificate as satisfying that requirement. The U.S. Office of Personnel Management has ruled it acceptable in federal civilian employment applications, and the U.S. Department of Education recognizes the CHSPE as equivalent to a high school diploma for various purposes, including applications for federal student aid.

Featured in the TV show 7th Heaven as a means for the character of Simon Camden to start college early, notable real alums include Grey's Anatomy'''s Chyler Leigh and other entertainment industry professionals.

Eligibility
Testers must be at least 16 years old or enrolled in the 2nd semester of 10th grade or higher at a California school to take the CHSPE. Students enrolled in school outside of California may not register until they are sixteen years of age. There is no upper age limit. Testers must pay $230 (2020-2021) by the regular registration deadline or more if late, and sit during one or more of the three exam dates offered a year.

Structure
The exam tests individuals based on the high school curriculum in California, which may or may not be similar to curriculums in other states. Though accepted by state and federal governments, testers must check to see if their college of choice outside of California will accept the test results. Another option for CHSPE test-takers is to enroll in a community college and transfer to their university of choice after two years. Those who have taken the California High School Exit Exam (CAHSEE), required of all high school students to graduate in California, will find the CHSPE similar in format, but somewhat longer in length and with more difficult questions.

The CHSPE tests mathematics and English-Language Arts (reading and writing) ability. The English-Language Arts section includes grammar and vocabulary questions, and also asks the examinee to write an essay. The math section assesses students on geometry, algebra, and pre-algebra. Testers have three and a half hours to complete the exam, and are free to divide their time as they wish between the two sections. Because the math and English sections are graded separately and can be passed separately, some students can sit for the exam twice, with three and a half hours for the math section and three and a half hours for English.

Mathematics
The CHSPE mathematics section has 50 multiple-choice questions broken into 4 content clusters: number sense and operations; patterns, relationships, and algebra; data, statistics, and probability; and geometry and measurement. Testers must score at least 350 within a range of 250–450 to pass the math section.

English language arts
The CHSPE English-language arts section has two subtests of reading and language (writing).

Reading
The reading subtest has 84 multiple-choice questions broken into seven content clusters: initial understanding; interpretation; critical analysis; strategies; synonyms; multiple meaning words; and context clues. Testers must score at least 350 within a range of 250–450 to pass the reading subtest.

Language with writing
The language subtest has 48 multiple-choice questions broken into six content clusters: capitalization; usage; punctuation; sentence structure; pre-writing; content and organization, in addition to a writing subtask. Testers must score at least 350 within a range of 250–450 on the language subtest, in addition to at least a 2.5 within a score range of 1-5 on the writing subtask to pass the English-language arts section.

CHSPE vs. GED
The CHSPE is only given in English, and targeted at homeschoolers and students who want to legally exit high school before 18 and/or start college early. Others are entertainment industry or agriculture professionals who prefer to start working at an earlier age.

In contrast, the GED is for adults 18 or over, who did not graduate high school, and is given in English, Spanish, and French.

Benefits
Upon passing the exam, testers receive a legal diploma equivalent and official transcript containing a score report, which can be used to enroll in college early. As with any college enrollment, assessment tests may be required upon college entrance to determine the student's ability for placement in the appropriate courses.

Testers under 18 years of age who pass the exam may not leave high school without parent or guardian consent. The CHSPE eliminates the need for minors to get a work permit before being employed, but is not otherwise considered "emancipation", and laws regulating minors still apply.

Notable alumni
Chyler Leigh – Grey's Anatomy actress, singer and model
Michael Eric Reid – American actor
Dove Cameron – American actress and singer
Austin Butler – American actor
Virginia Gardner – American actress

Fictional
Simon Camden – a 7th Heaven'' main character passes the CHSPE to start college early in season 8, episode 3 "PK (Preacher's Kid)"

See also
CAHSEE
GED
High school graduation examination in the United States

References

External links
 
 CHSPE Test Review

Standardized tests in the United States